Standings and results for Group 1 of the UEFA Euro 1980 qualifying tournament.

Group 1 consisted of Bulgaria, Denmark, England, Northern Ireland and Republic of Ireland. The draw paired together the two Irelands for the first time in International competition. Group winners were England, who went undefeated in qualifying, finishing 6 points clear of second-placed Northern Ireland.  In doing so, England ended a decade of failing to qualify for a major international tournament, having last appeared at the 1970 FIFA World Cup.

Final table

Results

Goalscorers

References
 
 

Group 1
1978–79 in English football
qual
1978–79 in Republic of Ireland association football
1979–80 in Republic of Ireland association football
1978–79 in Northern Ireland association football
1979–80 in Northern Ireland association football
1978 in Danish football
1979 in Danish football
1978–79 in Bulgarian football
1979–80 in Bulgarian football
1977–78 in Republic of Ireland association football
1979–80 in English football